= Zh-TW =

zh-TW is an IETF language tag for the Chinese language as used in Taiwan, meaning any of:

- Taiwanese Mandarin
- the use of traditional Chinese characters in writing, as done in Taiwan
- Taiwanese Hokkien, a variety of Min Nan Chinese, which could be indicated more specifically by nan-TW.
